Jilin City, alternately romanized as Kirin, is the second-largest city and former capital of Jilin province in northeast China. A prefecture-level city, it is the only major city nationally that shares its name with its province.

Jilin City is also known as the River City because of the Songhua River surrounding much of the city. In 2007, it co-hosted the Asian Winter Games.

History 
Jilin City is one of the oldest cities in Northeast China.

During the reign of the Yongle Emperor in the Ming dynasty, efforts were made to expand Ming control throughout all of Manchuria. Mighty river fleets were built and sailed several times from Jilin City, getting the chieftains of the local tribes to swear allegiance to the Ming rulers. 
Soon after the establishment of the Manchu-led Qing dynasty, the territory of today's Primorsky Kray was put under the administration of Jilin. As the Russian Empire advanced eastward to the Pacific coast, the Qing government ordered a naval shipbuilding factory to be set up here in 1661. Jilin was officially established as a fort city in 1673 when Anzhuhu, the Deputy Lieutenant-General, was ordered to build a castle in Jilin. In 1676, the Military Governor of Ninguta was transferred to Jilin City because of its more convenient location and increasing military importance, while the former Deputy Lieutenant-General was transferred in the opposite direction to Ninguta. Since then Jilin City has developed at a rapid pace. The nickname of Jilin City is River City, which originates from one sentence "" of a poem written by Kangxi Emperor when he was visiting Jilin City in 1682. Jilin retained its importance into the 18th and 19th century as one of the few cities existing beyond the Willow Palisade, along with Tsitsihar, Ninguta and Mukden.

After Manchukuo established their capital in Hsinking (present-day Changchun), Jilin City's importance decreased. By 1940, Jilin's population was 173,624, while Hsinking's population reached 544,202 at the same time. Soviet forces captured Jilin during the August Storm operation.

Jilin became the provincial capital of Jilin Province after the establishment of the People's Republic of China in 1949, until Changchun took this position in 1956.

Geography

Jilin City, which is located in central Jilin Province spanning from 125° 40' to 127° 56' E longitude and 42° 31' to 44° 40' N latitude. Neighbouring prefectures are:
Harbin, Heilongjiang (N)
Changchun (W)
Siping (W)
Yanbian (E)
Liaoyuan (S)
Tonghua (S)
Baishan (S)
Jilin City is situated in a hilly area near the Songhua River.
There are four famous mountains surrounding Jilin City, which is North Mountain in the west, Long Tan Mountain in the east, Zhuque Mountain in the North, and Turtle Mountain in the south, plus Songhua River, it forms a bagua in Taiji pattern.
North Mountain, called Beishan, is the most famous mountain in Jilin City and is home to several Buddhist Temples. The Qianlong Emperor reportedly visited the mountain.

Climate

Jilin City has a four-season, monsoon-influenced, humid continental climate (Köppen Dwa). Spring and autumn are somewhat short transitional periods, with some precipitation, but are usually dry and windy. Summers are hot and humid, with a prevailing southeasterly wind due to the East Asian monsoon; July averages . Snow is usually light during the winter, and annual rainfall is heavily concentrated from June to August.

Environmental issues

2005 Jilin benzene pollution

The Jilin chemical plant explosions were a series of explosions which occurred on November 13, 2005, in the No.101 Petrochemical Plant in Jilin City, killing six. The explosion severely polluted the Songhua River, with an estimated 100 tons of pollutants containing benzene and nitrobenzene entering into the river. The benzene level recorded was at one point 108 times above national safety levels. This caused downstream major cities including Harbin, Songyuan and Khabarovsk suspending their water supply for almost one week. Chinese leaders later had to apologize to the Russian government over its handling of the incident as the pollutants finally flowed into the Amur (Heilong) River, the major boundary river between China and Russia.

2010 Jilin floods and pollution
Jilin was one of the worst-hit regions in China by rain and landslides in the 2010 summer China floods. There were reports that some barrels exploded on contact with water. By late afternoon on August 1, 6,387 barrels had been retrieved from the river. Officials stated that tests show the water in the river remains safe to drink. Three soldiers of the People's Liberation Army in Jilin drowned after working to remove the barrels and control the flooding. The Dahe Dam in Changshan Township was breached on July 28, spilling 4 million m3 of water, destroying five villages downstream and leaving 40 people dead or missing. Over 100 were dead or missing after floods devastated Jilin prefecture. Workers started repairing fifty-one damaged small reservoirs and fortifying riverbanks in the province after the Songhua River surged to levels twice as high as normal.

Administrative divisions

Tourism

Jilin City is a popular destination for tourists to come each winter to view the magnificent rime ice on trees along the banks of the Songhua River, (the river is the only river in the region that does not freeze in winter). The rime ice is a natural phenomenon that occurs every year during January and February. It is a result of water vapor rising up from the warm Songhua River to meet the cold  night air, causing the crystallisation of water vapour on willows branches.

Attractions:
 Meteorite Museum (largest stony meteorite of a documented meteorite fall)
 North Hill (Beishan in Chinese) Park (north-west of Jilin)
 Dragon Pool Mountain Park
 Songhua Lake (south-east of Jilin)
 Wulajie (formerly also transcribed as Wulakai) Old City, a Qing dynasty walled town in Longtan District, on the east bank of the Sungari River downstream from Jilin's main urban area. The place was the center for collection of local products to the imperial court during the Qing dynasty. In 1682—when, according to Ferdinand Verbiest, Wulajie (Ula) was "the most illustrious city of the whole province"—the Kangxi Emperor himself visited the place to enjoy sturgeon fishing. These days, a public school nearby is one of the few schools in the country where some Manchu is taught.

Sports
The winter sports in Jilin City are full of interests, such as skiing, skating, sledding, snowboarding, and winter swim. Winter swimming is widely practiced in Jilin city.

Ski resorts:
 Beidahu ski resort
 Lake Songhua ski resort
 North Hill ski resort
 Zhuque Hill ski resort
 Wujiashan ski resort
 Filibiin swimming resort

Education

High school
 Jilin City No.1 High School
 Jilin Yuwen High School
 Ararsame Second High School

Universities and Colleges
 Beihua University
 Northeast Dianli University
 Jilin Institute of Chemical Technology
 Jilin Agriculture University
 Jilin Medical College

Transportation

Air
The city used to be served by the Jilin Ertaizi Airport . But by October 3, 2005, all of its commercial flights were transferred to the newly opened Changchun Longjia International Airport while Jilin Airport halted operation.

China Southern Airlines also provide some international connections directly from Changchun.

Railway

Jilin is served by the Jilin railway station. Jilin railway station is on the East-West Changchun-Tumen Railway mainline and provides convenient access to many cities around China, including Beijing, Tianjin, Dalian, Jinan, Hangzhou. Services to Harbin, Changchun and Shenyang are also frequent and convenient through the Harbin-Dalian high-speed rail and its branch from Changchun to Jilin.

Road transport
China National Highway 202

International relations

Twin towns—Sister cities
Jilin City is twinned with:

 Nakhodka Primorsky Krai, Russia (1991)
 Spokane, Washington, United States
 Cherkasy, Cherkasy Oblast, Ukraine
 Östersund, Jämtland, Sweden
 Volgograd, Volgograd Oblast, Russia
 Yamagata, Yamagata Prefecture, Japan
 Chongjin, North Hamgyong, North Korea

See also
 Jilin chemical plant explosions 2005
 2010 China floods in Jilin Province

References

External links

 
 Official Jilin City government website 
 

 
Cities in Jilin
Prefecture-level divisions of Jilin
Songhua River